The 1957 Holy Cross Crusaders football team was an American football team that represented the College of the Holy Cross as an independent during the 1957 NCAA University Division football season. In its 14th year under head coach Eddie Anderson, the team compiled a 5–3–1 record. The team played its home games at Fitton Field on the college's campus in Worcester, Massachusetts.

Schedule

Statistical leaders 
Statistical leaders for the 1957 Crusaders included:
 Rushing: Dick Surrette, 216 yards and 1 touchdown on 70 attempts
 Passing: Tom Greene, 1,297 yards, 44 completions and 11 touchdowns on 159 attempts
 Receiving: Dick Berardino, 420 yards and 4 touchdowns on 22 receptions
 Scoring: Tom Greene, 45 points on 5 touchdowns and 15 PATs
 Total offense: Tom Greene, 1,381 yards (1,297 passing, 84 rushing)
 All-purpose yards: Dick Berardino, 420 yards (all rushing)

References

Holy Cross
Holy Cross Crusaders football seasons
Holy Cross Crusaders football